"Sid" is the fifth episode of the first series of the British teen drama Skins. It was written by Jamie Brittain and directed by Minkie Spiro. It aired on E4 on 22 February 2007. It is told from the point of view of main character Sid Jenkins.

Plot synopsis

Sid's parents, Liz and Mark, have been called into Sid's college to discuss his failing grade in A-Level history. Sid's history teacher, Tom, informs Liz, Mark and Sid that he is allowing Sid 48 hours to rewrite his paper. Mark, frustrated at his son's consistent inability to perform academically, grounds Sid and tells him to work on his history essay. He tells Sid that he is to come home immediately from drama. Sid, however, skips drama to go to College Green with Maxxie and Anwar. Sid tells Cassie that he cannot go on their date as he is grounded and has to stay at home and rewrite his history coursework. Cassie says she might come around to Sid's house.

Meanwhile, on the Green, Tony tells Michelle she and Sid are to attend his concert with the City Chamber Choir that evening. Tony goes to Sid's house to tell him, also. Sid, sexually frustrated, bored, and looking forward to seeing Michelle decides to go. He changes and escapes from the house while his parents are arguing.

At the concert, Tony and Abigail share a scripted kiss scene, upsetting Michelle as Tony seems a bit too into it. Michelle and Sid burst backstage where Michelle finds Tony with his hand up Abigail's shirt. Tony tells Michelle that he was just feeling Abigail's diaphragm but Michelle does not believe this. Furious, Michelle storms from the concert and Tony tells Sid he set it up on purpose so Michelle and Sid could get together. Sid, concerned, goes after Michelle, who gets attacked by a gang of chav girls, who also accuse her of giving them cheek. Sid separates Michelle and the chavs, but Michelle believes Sid must have known about Tony's plans and slaps him. Sid is then himself attacked by the chavs.

Sid returns home battered and bruised and urinated on. While his mother gives him sympathy, his father chastises him on his stupidity and disobedience. Sid angers his father further by calling him a dildo. In his room, Sid finds an upset Cassie, who is hurt that Sid met up with Michelle instead of her. She kisses him and leaves, telling Sid everything is his choice, hinting at her love for him.

The next day, Sid's mum gives him a lift to college, and tries to tell him something but is unable to. She tells him he has to get on better with his dad. Sid, concerned that Michelle skived off history, calls her and arranges to meet her in a club. Cassie overhears the conversation and is distraught.

At the club, Michelle apologises for forgetting Sid and Tony are different people, and the two dance. Just as it seems Sid and Michelle are going to finally get together, Tony shows up and reconciles with Michelle. Sid tries to leave, but Tony holds him back, making Sid watch while Tony steals the girl right out from under him. Cassie attempts suicide up on one of her favourite park benches, one with a view of some of Bristol's housing estates. She takes many pills with vodka. Sid rings Cassie's mobile but gets through to Jal who is riding in the ambulance with her. Sid goes to the hospital, but an angry Jal tells him to leave, as he is partially responsible for what happened.

When Sid gets home he finds his dad solemn and brooding. Mark tells Sid his mother left him and Sid bitterly requotes his father's chastising remarks at the college, grounding his dad until he can win his mother back. Sid, emphatically, rewrites his history essay, staying up all night to finish it.

Acting

Main cast
 Mike Bailey as Sid Jenkins
 Hannah Murray as Cassie Ainsworth
 April Pearson as Michelle Richardson
 Nicholas Hoult as Tony Stonem
 Larissa Wilson as Jal Fazer
 Joe Dempsie as Chris Miles
 Mitch Hewer as Maxxie Oliver
 Dev Patel as Anwar Kharral

Arc significance and continuity

Sid's homelife
 In this episode, Sid's parents separate on account of his father's constant bad mood and general attitude and behaviour.
 Mark is portrayed as an ill-tempered cretin who constantly bickers with his family and is often disappointed because of Sid's lack of academic ability.
 Even within Sid's own home, he is living under Tony's shadow. His parents are impressed with and admiring of Tony's intelligence and good looks.

Series relevance
 Tony's manipulative streak increases into cruel mind games as Tony lures Sid into false hope only to dash it, and also purposely hurts Michelle in order to win her back.
 Sid is seen to be failing his history A-Levels.
 Cassie tries to kill herself and is readmitted into her clinic for depression and self-destructive behaviour.
 Michelle begins to suspect Tony's infidelity with Abigail.

Soundtrack
 "Grunge Betty" by The Dandy Warhols
 "Underwear" by The Magnetic Fields
 "Date with the Night" by the Yeah Yeah Yeahs
 "God Only Knows" by Nicholas Hoult, Georgina Moffat and the Bristol City Chamber Choir
 "Little David (Play on Your Harp)" by Bristol City Chamber Choir
 "Total Eclipse of the Heart" by Georgina Moffat
 "Main Offender" by The Hives
 "Old Fashioned Morphine" by Jolie Holland
 "This Is My Beginning" by Floxit
 "Be Cool Be Nice" by St. Thomas
 "You Look Great When I'm High" by The Brian Jonestown Massacre
 "Hell is Round the Corner" by Tricky

References

External links 
 Watch "Sid" on 4od
 "Sid" on e4.com/skins
 Skins on Internet Movie DataBase

2007 British television episodes
Skins (British TV series) episodes